Saint Jerome in His Study may refer to the following artworks depicting Saint Jerome:
Ordered chronologically
 Saint Jerome in His Study (after van Eyck), a 1442 painting attributed to the workshop of Jan van Eyck
 Saint Jerome in His Study (Colantonio), a c. 1445–1446 painting
 St Jerome in His Study (Antonello da Messina), a c. 1474 painting
 Saint Jerome in His Study (Ghirlandaio), a 1480 fresco by Domenico Ghirlandaio
 Saint Jerome in His Study (Dürer), a 1514 engraving by Albrecht Dürer
 St. Jerome in His Study (Dürer, 1521), a painting by Albrecht Dürer
 Saint Jerome in His Study, a 1526 painting by Lucas Cranach the Elder
 Saint Jerome in his Study, a 1541 painting by Marinus van Reymerswaele
 Saint Jerome Writing, or Saint Jerome in His Study, a c. 1605–1606 painting by Caravaggio in Rome
 Saint Jerome Writing (Caravaggio, Valletta), or Saint Jerome in His Study, a c. 1607–1608 painting

de:Hieronymus (Kirchenvater)#Kunstgeschichte